This is a List of Dutch cyclists, ordered alphabetically.

A

 André van Aert
 Jos van Aert
 John van den Akker
 Theo Akkermans
 Thijs Al
 Jos Alberts
 Jan Aling
 Marcel Arntz

B

 Dylan van Baarle
 Henk Baars
 Arjen de Baat
 W.G. del Baere
 Maarten den Bakker
 Cees Bal
 Frank van Bakel
 Maas van Beek
 Daniëlle Bekkering
 Dirk Bellemakers
 Chantal Beltman
 Henk Benjamins
 Camiel van den Bergh
 Eddy Beugels
 Guus Bierings
 Frits van Bindsbergen
 Chantal Blaak
 Theo Blankenauw
 Cor Blekemolen
 Jeroen Blijlevens
 Hans Bockkom
 Jeroen Boelen
 Coen Boerman
 Cees Boelhouwers
 Henk Boeve
 Cesar Bogaert
 John Bogers
 Jetse Bol
 Léon van Bon
 Michael Boogerd
 Lars Boom
 Jan Bos
 Marco Bos
 Theo Bos
 Gerard Bosch van Drakestein
 Eddy Bouwmans
 Jan Boven
 Janus Braspennincx
 John Braspennincx
 Piet Braspennincx
 Hein van Breenen
 Piet van de Brekel
 Bart Brentjens
 Erik Breukink
 Jan Breur
 Jan Brinkman
 Johnny Broers
 Petra de Bruin
 Brian Bulgac
 Toine van de Bunder

C

 Stef Clement
 Leo Coehorst
 Stefan Cohnen
 Mathieu Cordang
 Tom Cordes
 Michel Cornelisse
 Bjorn Cornelissen
 Roy Curvers

D

 Hans Daams
 Laurens ten Dam
 Piet Damen
 Erik Dekker
 Thomas Dekker
 Hans Dekkers (1928)
 Hans Dekkers (1981)
 Jan Derksen
 Piet Dickentman
 Daan van Dijk
 Ellen van Dijk, 4× world champion
 Stefan van Dijk
 Herbert Dijkstra
 Evert Dolman
 Jef Dominicus
 Leo van Dongen
 Wies van Dongen (1931)
 Wies van Dongen (1957)
 Johannes Draaijer
 Maarten Ducrot
 Tom Dumoulin
 Piet van den Dungen
 Huub Duyn
 Leo Duyndam

E

 Jaap Eden
 Jacques van Egmond
 Michiel Elijzen
 Theo Eltink
 Jos van Emden
 Addy Engels
 Dick Enthoven
 Cees Erkelens
 Aafke Eshuis
 Cees van Espen
 Nico van Est
 Piet van Est
 Wim van Est
 Patrick Eyk

F

 Henk Faanhof
 Rick Flens
 Joop Franssen
 Jan Frijters

G

 Ab Geldermans
 Mees Gerritsen
 Gerrie van Gerwen
 Robert Gesink
 André Gevers
 Bas Giling
 Suzanne de Goede
 Floris Goesinnen
 Lou de Groen
 Henk van de Griendt
 Tiemen Groen
 Richard Groenendaal
 Dick Groeneweg
 Bram de Groot
 Cor de Groot
 Daan de Groot
 Jan de Groot
 Loes Gunnewijk

H

 Jo de Haan
 Piet Haan
 Cees Haast
 Marten van Hal
 Jacques Hanegraaf
 Ingrid Haringa
 Jan Harings
 Ger Harings
 Huub Harings
 Rob Harmeling
 Arie den Hartog
 Max van Heeswijk
 Piet van Heusden
 Mathieu Heijboer
 Levi Heimans
 Janus Hellemons
 Mathieu Hermans
 Fedor den Hertog
 Nidi den Hertog
 Bert Hiemstra
 Yvonne Hijgenaar
 Aad van den Hoek
 Sam Hoevens
 Tristan Hoffman
 Reinier Honig
 Henk de Hoog
 Johnny Hoogerland
 Jan van Hout
 Adri van Houwelingen
 Arie van Houwelingen
 Jan van Houwelingen
 Jan Hugens
 Jenning Huizenga
 Kenny van Hummel

I

 Piet Ikelaar

J

 Wim de Jager
 Gert Jakobs
 Ben Janbroers
 Harm Jansen
 Harrie Jansen
 Jan Jansen
 Jan Janssen
 Sjefke Janssen
 Piet de Jongh
 Rein de Jongh
 Steven de Jongh
 Patrick Jonker
 Cees Joosen

K

 Chris Kalkman
 Willy Kanis
 Gerben Karstens
 Alain van Katwijk
 Fons van Katwijk
 Jan van Katwijk
 Piet van Katwijk
 Martijn Keizer
 Wilco Kelderman
 Wim Kelleners
 Rudie Kemna
 Frank Kersten
 Jaap Kersten
 Emiel Kerstens
 Pim Kiderlen
 Peter Kisner
 Moniek Kleinsman
 Rigard van Klooster
 Servais Knaven
 Gerben de Knegt
 Gerrie Knetemann
 Monique Knol
 Leo Knops
 Cees Koeken
 Gerard Koel
 Jans Koerts
 Ben Koken
 Martin Kokkelkoren
 Carel A. Koning
 Louis de Koning
 Koen de Kort
 André de Korver
 Michel Kreder
 Raymond Kreder
 Jan Krekels
 Karsten Kroon
 Steven Kruijswijk
 Hennie Kuiper

L

 Jef Lahaye
 Jan Lambrichs
 Jos Lammertink
 Johan Lammerts
 Sebastian Langeveld
 Bernard Leene
 Tom Leezer
 Godert de Leeuw
 Michel Legrand
 Joost van Leijen
 Rudie Liebrechts
 Pim Ligthart
 Elis Ligtlee
 Bert-Jan Lindeman
 Leijn Loevesijn
 Marc Lotz
 René Lotz
 Gerben Löwik
 Henk Lubberding
 Marcel Luppes
 Cees Lute
 Willem-Jan van Loenhout
 Daan Luijkx

M

 Marc de Maar
 Jo Maas
 Martijn Maaskant
 Frans Maassen
 Frans Mahn
 Bas Maliepaard
 Henri Manders
 Barry Markus
 Antoine Mazairac
 Jacques van Meer
 Jaap Meijer
 Raymond Meijs
 Mirjam Melchers
 Willem van der Mey
 Theofiel (Theo) Middelkamp
 Gaby Minneboo
 Koos Moerenhout
 Piet Moeskops
 Peter Möhlmann
 Wouter Mol
 Bauke Mollema
 Leontien van Moorsel
 Louis Motké
 Jens Mouris
 Teun Mulder
 Rob Mulders
 Ronald Mutsaars

N

 Herman Nankman
 Klaas van Nek
 Piet van Nek
 Danny Nelissen
 Coen Niesten
 Heddie Nieuwdorp
 Erwin Nijboer
 Henk Nijdam
 Jelle Nijdam
 Jan Nolten

O

 Thijs van Oers
 Keetie van Oosten-Hage
 Bert Oosterbosch
 Marc van Orsouw
 Harm Ottenbros
 Jaap Oudkerk
 Daniëlle Overgaag

P

 Leo Peelen
 Maurice Peeters
 Kees Pellenaars
 Gerard Peters
 Peter Pieters
 Jan Pieterse
 René Pijnen
 Jan Pijnenburg
 Frits Pirard
 Leo van der Pluym
 Adri van der Poel
 Twan Poels
 Wout Poels
 Herman Ponsteen
 Boy van Poppel
 Jean-Paul van Poppel
 Peter Post
 Joost Posthuma
 Cees Priem
 Henk Prinsen
 Wim Prinsen
 Bert Pronk
 Jos Pronk
 Matthé Pronk
 Mattheus Pronk
 Mathieu Pustjens

R

 Jan Raas
 H.W. van Raden
 Henri L. Raland
 Rik Reinerink
 Philip Reijnders
 Cees Rentmeester
 Piet Rentmeester
 Kai Reus
 Thijs Roks
 Fred Rompelberg
 Jo de Roo
 Piet Rooijakkers
 Steven Rooks
 Theo de Rooij
 Gerrit Van De Ruit
 Wim de Ruiter
 Rob Ruygh
 Wim de Ruyter

S

 Paul van Schalen
 Martin Schalkers
 Bouk Schellingerhoudt
 Albert van Schendel
 Antoon van Schendel
 Peter Schep
 Wim Schepers
 Niels Scheuneman
 Jos Schipper
 Krijn Schippers
 Bram Schmitz
 Leander Schreurs
 Jan Schröder
 Roy Schuiten
 Gerrit Schulte
 Eddy Schurer
 Jan Serpenti
 Jan Siemons
 Marc Siemons
 Danny Sijen
 Huub Sijen
 Theo Sijthoff
 Tom-Jelte Slagter
 Fedor Slegtenhorst
 Robert Slippens
 Adrie Slot
 Julien Smink
 Theo Smit
 Truus Smulders
 Herman Snoeijink
 Gerrit Solleveld
 Jan Spetgens
 Cees Stam
 Danny Stam
 Hennie Stamsnijder
 Tom Stamsnijder
 Antoon van der Steen
 Peter Stevenhaagen
 Harrie Steevens
 Michel (Mies) Stolker
 Jeroen Straathof
 Wim Stroetinga
 Piet van Sundert
 Adri Suykerbuyk
 Luc Suykerbuyk
 Spencer Schultz

T

 Tino Tabak
 John Talen
 Henk Tamse
 Bram Tankink
 Niki Terpstra
 Gert-Jan Theunisse
 Albert Timmer
 Maarten Tjallingii
 Patrick Tolhoek
 Bobbie Traksel
 Jan Tulleken

U

V

 Marinus Valentijn
 Tom Veelers
 Wiebren Veenstra
 Johan van der Velde
 Gerard Veldscholten
 Tim Veldt
 Thorwald Veneberg
 Martin Venix
 Nico Verhoeven
 Coen Vermeltfoort
 Marco Vermey
 Martijn Verschoor
 Gerard Vianen
 Aart Vierhouten
 Jef van de Vijver
 Adrie Visser
 Jos van der Vleuten
 Arie van Vliet
 Gerrit van Vliet
 Leo van Vliet
 Teun van Vliet
 Adri Voorting
 Gerrit Voorting
 Marianne Vos
 Wim de Vos
 Bart Voskamp
 Gerrit de Vries
 Pieter Vries

W

 Rini Wagtmans
 Wout Wagtmans
 Eelke van der Wal
 Arno Wallaard
 Cor Wals
 Pieter Weening
 Floor v.d. Weijden
 Lieuwe Westra
 Jorinus van der Wiel
 Remmert Wielinga
 Frits Wiersma
 Dries van Wijhe
 Ad Wijnands
 Ko Willems
 Dennis van Winden
 Peter Winnen
 Wouter Wippert
 Piet de Wit

Y

 Renger Ypenburg

Z

 Michel Zanoli
 Peter Zijerveld
 Leontien Zijlaard-van Moorsel
 Huub Zilverberg
 Bart Zoet
 Joop Zoetemelk
 Thijs Zonneveld
 Cees Zoontjens
 Wilco Zuijderwijk

See also
 List of Dutch Olympic cyclists
 :Category:Dutch cyclists
 List of British cyclists

References

 
Dutch
Cyclists